Cyclosorus elegans is a species of ferns in the Thelypteridaceae. It is found in China.

References

External links 

 Cyclosorus elegans at Tropicos

Thelypteridaceae
Ferns of Asia
Plants described in 1976